"Get Down" is a song recorded by British singer and songwriter James Arthur. It was released on 3 March 2014 as the fourth and final single from his self-titled 2013 debut studio album, James Arthur.

Background
Originally, the backing track for the song "Get Down" belonged to Mutya Keisha Siobhan, formed by the original Sugababes members Mutya Buena, Keisha Buchanan and Siobhán Donaghy. The song was called "Too In Love" and was not released. The instrumental was used in a song they were recording for the album The Sacred Three. The arrangement was later used by Arthur for "Get Down". The MKS track was leaked on 25 December 2016, three years after Arthur's song.

On 14 January 2014, Arthur confirmed on Twitter that "Get Down" would be the fourth single to be released from his debut album. The track premiered online on 20 January 2014.

Prior to the release of "Get Down", Arthur had generated much controversy in November 2013, over the use of homophobic lyrics in a song. Micky Worthless, a Croydon battle rapper, had issued "Stay in Your Lane", a track mocking Arthur, because Worthless did not feel it was right that Arthur was presenting himself as a battle rapper on national radio. Arthur had responded to Worthless with his vitriolic diss track "Hey Mickey" issuing string of slurs directed at Worthless, rapping "Hilarious, precarious you Talibani confused, imbellic mimic of a gimmick" adding the homophobic slur "You fucking queer".<ref name=nme>{{cite news|url=https://www.nme.com/news/james-arthur/73906#WWPR8wbfETQEEG7c.99|title=Rapper who started beef with 'X Factors James Arthur says 'I feel no remorse at all'|author=Adam Bychawski|publisher=NME|date=18 November 2013|accessdate=23 September 2016}}</ref> This sparked outrage among the LGBT community and led to Twitter spats with comedians Frankie Boyle and Matt Lucas, and singer Lucy Spraggan. Arthur immediately apologised for his comments and claimed that he was not homophobic. Following this, he announced that he would not be posting on Twitter anymore, with his management taking up control of his page. The backlash continued, however, with a Facebook campaign to see his upcoming appearance on The X Factor be cancelled.

Many radio stations were reluctant to play the song "Get Down" due to controversy over Arthur. Several stations even blacklisted the song. This led to very weak sales for the single "Get Down".

In defense of Arthur, an online petition was launched on the website Change.org in a bid to get Arthur some airplay. The petition stated that Arthur is "a talented singer who needs to be heard" and urged BBC Radio 1 to play "Get Down". The petition was signed by over 830 people. The single only made it to number 96 on the UK Singles Chart.

iTunes offered refunds for Arthur's debut album James Arthur due to complaints from customers.

Arthur performed it live in an acoustic session and published it on 5 November 2013 in his own YouTube channel titled "Get Down (Acoustic)". He also performed it live in a duo with contestant Shem Thomas during The Voice of Switzerland in 2014. Arthur has included the song in his later concerts despite the single not making much impact when released.

Music video
The audio track was uploaded to YouTube on 20 January 2014. The official music video premiered on 3 March 2014, the same day as the single's release.

Track listing
CD single
"Get Down" – 3:46
"Get Down" (Live) – 5:47

Digital remixes EP
"Get Down" (Live) – 5:47
"Get Down" (Smooth Remix) – 4:58
"Get Down" (D-Wayne Remix) – 6:45
"Get Down" (Taiki & Nulight Remix) – 5:05
"Get Down" (Sharoque Remix) – 3:54

Charts

Release history

John River version
In 2015, the song was sampled by Canadian rapper John River, under the same title "Get Down", but with altered rap lyrics and verses, keeping the main music sequences including samples from the original. The song was planned to appear on the mixtape The Storm, River's follow up to his debut mixtape The Calm. The track was advertised as the "third installment" off the upcoming mixtape, but ultimately didn't make the final cut.

A music video for River's version was shot in Mississauga, Ontario, Canada and was directed by Abstrakte and produced by MadRuk Ent. It premiered on River's official YouTube channel on 23 June 2015.

River's version of the track was featured prominently in the second season of the popular web series Teenagers''.

External links
Vimeo: James Arthur - Get Down - Official music video
James Arthur YouTube channel - "Get Down (Acousic)

References

2014 singles
2013 songs
James Arthur songs
Syco Music singles
Songs written by Wayne Hector
Songs written by James Arthur
Songs written by Mustafa Omer
Songs written by Jonny Coffer
Songs written by Ronald Bell (musician)